The 1978 Eastern Michigan Hurons football team represented Eastern Michigan University in the 1978 NCAA Division I-A football season. In their first season under head coach Mike Stock, the Hurons compiled a 3–7 record (1–5 against conference opponents), finished in last place in the Mid-American Conference, and were outscored by their opponents, 238 to 122. The team's statistical leaders included Burt Beaney with 833 passing yards, Doug Crisan with 485 rushing yards, and Tom Parm with 363 receiving yards.

Schedule

References

Eastern Michigan
Eastern Michigan Eagles football seasons
Eastern Michigan Hurons football